Kamta-Rajaula was a princely state in India during the British Raj.

History
It was one of the Chaube Jagirs, part of the Bagelkhand Agency which was merged into the Indian state of Vindhya Pradesh in 1948.

Kamta-Rajaula was a place of pilgrimage, for according to legend it was one of the places where Rama had been. The capital was the village of Rajaula, located at 15 km from Karwi railway station.

Rulers
The rulers of Kamta-Rajaula were titled 'Rao'.

Raos
 1812 - 1874 Gopal Lal
 1874 - 1892  Bharat Prasad
 1892 - 1906 Ram Prasad
 1906 -  1946 Radha Kishan
 1946 - 1947  Rajiv Nandan Prasad

See also 
 Bundelkhand Agency
 Political integration of India

References 

Satna district
Princely states of Madhya Pradesh